Dame Anna Wintour  (born 3 November 1949) is a British journalist based in New York City who has served as editor-in-Chief of Vogue since 1988 and Global Chief Content Officer for Condé Nast since 2020; she is also the artistic director of Condé Nast and the Global Editorial Director of Vogue. With her trademark pageboy bob haircut and dark sunglasses, Wintour has become an important figure in much of the fashion world, praised for her eye for emerging fashion trends. Her reportedly aloof and demanding personality has earned her the nickname "Nuclear Wintour".

Her father, Charles Wintour, Editor of the London Evening Standard (1959–1976), consulted with her on how to make the newspaper relevant to the youth of the era. She became interested in fashion as a teenager. Her career in fashion journalism began at two British magazines. Later, she moved to the US, with stints at New York and House & Garden. She returned to London and was the editor of British Vogue between 1985 and 1987. A year later, she assumed control of the franchise's magazine in New York, reviving what many saw as a stagnating publication. Her use of the magazine to shape the fashion industry has been the subject of debate within it. Animal rights activists have attacked her for promoting fur, while other critics have charged her with using the magazine to promote elitist views of femininity and beauty.

A former personal assistant, Lauren Weisberger, wrote the 2003 bestselling roman à clef The Devil Wears Prada, later made into a successful 2006 film starring Meryl Streep as Miranda Priestly, a fashion editor, believed to be based on Wintour. In 2009, Wintour was the focus of a documentary film, R. J. Cutler's The September Issue.

Early life and family
Anna Wintour was born in Hampstead, London, to Charles Wintour (1917–1999), editor of the Evening Standard, and Eleanor "Nonie" Trego Baker (1917–1995), an American, the daughter of a Harvard Law School professor. Her parents were married in 1940 and divorced in 1979. Wintour was named after her maternal grandmother, Anna Baker (née Gilkyson), a merchant's daughter from Pennsylvania. Audrey Slaughter, a magazine editor who founded publications such as Honey and Petticoat, is her stepmother.<ref name="The Media in Britain">{{cite book|title=The Media in Britain|last=Tunstall|first=Jeremy|year=1983|publisher=Columbia University Press|isbn=0-231-05816-0|page=103|url=https://books.google.com/books?id=p4J80JqdUZgC&q=%22Audrey%20Slaughter%22%2Bhoney&pg=PA103|access-date=10 June 2010|quote=...[F]or example a newish magazine is often identified with a particular editor; an example is the association of Audrey Slaughter in the 1960s and 70s with a succession of young women's publications — Honey, Petticoat, and Over 21.}}</ref>

Wintour's grandfather was Major-General Fitzgerald Wintour, a British military officer and descendent of Prime Minister George Grenville. Through her paternal grandmother, Alice Jane Blanche Foster, Wintour is a great-great-great-granddaughter of the late-18th-century novelist Lady Elizabeth Foster (later the Duchess of Devonshire) and her first husband, the Irish politician John Thomas Foster. Her great-great-great-great-grandfather was Frederick Hervey, 4th Earl of Bristol, who served as the Anglican Bishop of Derry. Sir Augustus Vere Foster, 4th Baronet, the last Baronet of that name, was a granduncle of Wintour's. She is a niece of Cordelia James, Baroness James of Rusholme (daughter of Fitzgerald Wintour).

She had four siblings. Her older brother, Gerald, died in a traffic accident as a child. One of her younger brothers, Patrick, is also a journalist, currently diplomatic editor of The Guardian. James and Nora Wintour have worked in London local government and for international non-governmental organisations, respectively.

In her youth, Wintour was educated at the independent North London Collegiate School, where she frequently rebelled against the dress code by taking up the hemlines of her skirts. At the age of 14, she began wearing her hair in a bob. She developed an interest in fashion as a regular viewer of Cathy McGowan on Ready Steady Go!, and from the issues of Seventeen which her grandmother sent from the United States. "Growing up in London in the '60s, you'd have to have had Irving Penn's sack over your head not to know something extraordinary was happening in fashion", she recalled. Her father regularly consulted her when he was considering ideas for increasing readership in the youth market.

Career

From fashion to journalism
"I think my father really decided for me that I should work in fashion", she recalled in The September Issue. He arranged for his daughter's first job, at the influential Biba boutique, when she was 15. The next year, she left North London Collegiate and began a training program at Harrods. At her parents' behest, she also took fashion classes at a nearby school. Soon she gave them up, saying, "You either know fashion or you don't." Another older boyfriend, Richard Neville, gave her her first experience of magazine production at his popular and controversial Oz.

In 1970, when Harper's Bazaar UK merged with Queen to become Harper's & Queen, Wintour was hired as one of its first editorial assistants, beginning her career in fashion journalism. She told her co-workers that she wanted to edit Vogue. While there, she discovered model Annabel Hodin, a former North London classmate. Her connections helped her secure locations for innovative shoots by Helmut Newton, Jim Lee and other trend-setting photographers. One recreated the works of Renoir and Manet using models in go-go boots. After chronic disagreements with her rival, Min Hogg, she quit and moved to New York with her boyfriend, freelance journalist Jon Bradshaw.

New York City
In her new home, she became a junior fashion editor at Harper's Bazaar in New York City in 1975. Wintour's innovative shoots led editor Tony Mazzola to fire her after nine months. She was reportedly introduced to Bob Marley by one of Bradshaw's friends, and disappeared with him for a week;  in a 2017 appearance on The Late Late Show with James Corden, she said she had never actually met the reggae legend, but certainly would have "hooked up" with him if she had. A few months later, Bradshaw helped her get her first position as a fashion editor, at Viva, a women's adult magazine started by Kathy Keeton, then wife of Penthouse publisher Bob Guccione. She has rarely discussed working there, due to that connection. This was the first job at which she was able to hire a personal assistant, which began her reputation as a demanding and difficult boss.

In late 1978, Guccione shut down the unprofitable magazine. Wintour decided to take some time off from work. She broke up with Bradshaw and began a relationship with French record producer Michel Esteban, for two years dividing her time with him between Paris and New York. She returned to work in 1980, succeeding Elsa Klensch as fashion editor for a new women's magazine named Savvy. It sought to appeal to career-conscious professional women who spent their own money, the readers Wintour would later target at Vogue.

The following year, she became fashion editor of New York. There, the fashion spreads and photo shoots she had been putting together for years finally began attracting attention. Editor Edward Kosner sometimes bent very strict rules for her and let her work on other sections of the magazine. She learned through her work on a cover involving Rachel Ward how effectively celebrity covers sold copies. "Anna saw the celebrity thing coming before everyone else did", Grace Coddington said three decades later. A former colleague arranged for an interview with Vogue editor Grace Mirabella that ended when Wintour told Mirabella she wanted her job.Oppenheimer, p. 190.

Condé Nast
She went to work at Vogue when Alex Liberman, who was then the editorial director for Condé Nast and publisher of Vogue, talked to Wintour about a position there in 1983. She eventually accepted after a bidding war that doubled her salary, becoming the magazine's first creative director, a position with vaguely defined responsibilities. Her changes to the magazine were often made without Mirabella's knowledge, causing friction among the staff. She began dating child psychiatrist David Shaffer, an older acquaintance from London. They married in 1984.

In 1985, Wintour attained her first editorship, taking over the UK edition of Vogue after Beatrix Miller retired. Once in charge, she replaced many of the staff and exerted far more control over the magazine than any previous editor had, earning the nickname "Nuclear Wintour" in the process. Those editors who were retained began to refer to the period as "The Wintour of Our Discontent". Her changes moved the magazine from its traditional eccentricity to a direction more in line with the American magazine. Wintour's ideal reader was the same woman Savvy had tried to reach. "There's a new kind of woman out there", she told the Evening Standard. "She's interested in business and money. She doesn't have time to shop anymore. She wants to know what and why and where and how."

In 1987, Wintour returned to New York to take over House & Garden. Its circulation had long lagged behind rival Architectural Digest, and Condé Nast hoped she could improve it. Again, she made radical changes to staff and look, canceling $2 million worth of photo spreads and articles in her first week. She put so much fashion in photo spreads that it became known as House & Garment, and enough celebrities that it was referred to as Vanity Chair, within the industry. These changes worsened the magazine's problems. When the title was shortened to just HG, many longtime subscribers thought they were getting a new magazine and put it aside for the real thing to arrive. Most of those subscriptions were eventually canceled and, while some fashion advertisers came over, most of the magazine's traditional advertisers pulled out.

Ten months later, she became editor of US Vogue. Industry insiders worried that under Mirabella, the magazine was losing ground to the recently introduced American edition of Elle. After making sweeping changes in staff, she changed the style of the cover pictures. Mirabella had preferred tight head shots of well-known models in studios; Wintour's covers showed more of the body and were taken outside, like those Diana Vreeland had done years earlier. She used less well-known models, and mixed inexpensive clothes with high fashion: the first issue she was in charge of, November 1988, featured a Peter Lindbergh photograph of 19-year-old Michaela Bercu in a $50 pair of faded jeans and a bejeweled jacket by Christian Lacroix worth $10,000. It was the first time a Vogue cover model had worn jeans; when the printer saw it they called the magazine's offices, thinking it was the wrong image.

In 2012, Wintour reflected on the cover:

Years later, Wintour admitted the photo had never been planned as the cover shot. In 2011, when Vogue put its entire archive online, Wintour was quoted as saying, "I just said, 'Well, let's just try this.' And off we went. It was just very natural. To me it just said, 'This is something new. This is something different.'  The printers called to make sure that was supposed to be the cover, as they thought a mistake might have been made." In 2015, she said if she had to pick a favorite of her covers, it would be that one. "[I]t was a leap of faith and it was certainly a big change for Vogue."

"Wintour's approach hit a nerve—this was the way real women put clothes together (with the likely exception of wearing multi-thousand-dollar T-shirts)", one reviewer says. On the June 1989 cover, model Estelle Lefebure was shown in wet hair, with just a bathrobe and no apparent makeup. Photographers, makeup artists, and hairstylists got credited along with the models. In August 2014, Gigi Hadid paid tribute to Wintour's first cover.

She exerts a great deal of control over the magazine's visual content. Since her first days as editor, she has required that photographers not begin until she has approved Polaroids of the setup and clothing. Afterwards, they must submit all their work to the magazine, not just their personal choices.

Her control over the text is less certain. Her staff claim she reads everything written for publication,Oppenheimer, 325. but former editor Richard Story has claimed she rarely, if ever, reads any of Vogues arts coverage or book reviews. Earlier in her career, she often left writing of the text that accompanied her layouts to others; former coworkers claim she has minimal skills in that area. Today, she writes little for the magazine save the monthly editor's letter. She reportedly has three full-time assistants but sometimes surprises callers by answering the phone herself.

1990s
Under her editorship, the magazine renewed its focus on fashion and returned to the prominence it had held under Vreeland. Vogue held its position as market leader against three contenders: Elle; Harper's Bazaar, which had lured away Liz Tilberis, Wintour's most prominent deputy, and Mirabella, a magazine Rupert Murdoch created for Wintour's fired predecessor. Her most serious competitor was within the company: Tina Brown, editor of Vanity Fair and later The New Yorker.

At the end of the decade, another of Wintour's inner circle left to run Harper's Bazaar. Kate Betts, seen as Wintour's likely successor, had broadened the magazine's reach by commissioning stories with a more hard-news edge, about women in politics, street culture, and the financial difficulties of some major designers. She had also added the "Index" section, a few pages of tips meant to be torn out of the magazine. At staff meetings, she earned Wintour's respect as the only person who publicly challenged her.

The two began to disagree about the magazine's direction. Betts felt Vogue fashion coverage was getting too limited. Wintour in turn thought that the stories with popular culture angles Betts was assigning were beneath readers, and began pairing Betts with Plum Sykes, whom Betts reportedly detested as a "pretentious airhead". Eventually, she left, complaining to The New York Times that Wintour had not even sent her a baby gift. Wintour wrote an editor's letter that complimented Betts and wished her well.

2000s
Betts was one of several longtime editors to leave Vogue around the new millennium. A year later, Sykes, another putative successor, left to concentrate on her best-selling novels set in the city's upper classes and a screenplay. A number of other editors also left to assume the top jobs at other publications. While some of their replacements did not last, a new group of core editors formed.

The September 2004 issue was 832 pages, the largest issue of a monthly magazine ever published at that time, since exceeded by the September 2007 issue Cutler's documentary covered. Wintour oversaw the introduction of three spinoffs: Teen Vogue, Vogue Living and Men's Vogue. Teen Vogue has published more ad pages and earned more advertiser revenue than either Elle Girl and Cosmo Girl, and the 164 ad pages in the début issue of Men's Vogue were the most for a first issue in Condé Nast history. AdAge named her "Editor of the Year" for this brand expansion.

Queen Elizabeth II appointed her Officer of the Order of the British Empire (OBE) in the 2008 Birthday Honours.Anna Wintour awarded OBE, The Daily Telegraph. Retrieved 14 June 2008. However, 2008 was generally difficult year for Vogue, as the economy worsened. After ruffling feathers at the Milan shows in February, the April issue's cover image of LeBron James and Gisele Bündchen brought criticism for its evocation of racial stereotypes. The next month a lavish Karl Lagerfeld gown she wore to the Met's Costume Institute Gala was called "the worst fashion faux pas of 2008". In the fall, Vogue Living was suspended indefinitely, and Men's Vogue cut back to two issues a year as an outsert or supplement to the women's magazine. At the end of the year, December's cover highlighted a disparaging comment Jennifer Aniston made about Angelina Jolie, to the former's displeasure; media observers began speculating that Wintour had lost her touch.

In 2008, rumours arose that she would retire, and be replaced by French Vogue editor Carine Roitfeld. An editor at Russian GQ reportedly introduced Russian Vogue editor Aliona Doletskaya as the next editor of American Vogue. Condé Nast responded by taking out a full-page ad in The New York Times defending her record. In that same publication, Cathy Horyn later wrote that while Wintour had not lost her touch, the magazine had become "stale and predictable", as a reader had recently complained. "To read Vogue in recent years is to wonder about the peculiar fascination for the 'villa in Tuscany' story", Horyn added. The magazine also dealt awkwardly with the recession, she commented.

In 2009, Wintour began making more media appearances. On a 60 Minutes profile, she said she would not retire. "To me this is a really interesting time to be in this position and I think it would be in a way irresponsible not to put my best foot forward and lead us into a different time." A documentary film, The September Issue, by The War Room producer R.J. Cutler, about the production of the September 2007 issue, was released in September. It focused on the sometimes-difficult relationship between Wintour and creative director Grace Coddington. Wintour appeared on the Late Show with David Letterman to promote it, defending the relevance of fashion in a tough economy. The American Society of Magazine Editors elected her to its Hall of Fame in 2010.

2010s
In 2013, Condé Nast announced she would be taking on the position of artistic director for the company's magazines while remaining at Vogue. She assumed some of the responsibilities of Si Newhouse, the company's longtime chairman, who, in his mid-80s at the time, was retreating from his role at Condé Nast to oversee managing Advance Publications, its parent company. A company spokesman told The New York Times the position was created to keep Wintour. She described it as "an extension of what I am doing, but on a broader scale."

In January 2014, the Metropolitan Museum of Art named its Costume Institute complex after Wintour; First Lady Michelle Obama opened it in May of that year. Wintour starred in The Fashion Fund, which aired on Ovation TV that year as well; she was named the 39th most powerful woman in the world by Forbes.

On the occasion of the 10th anniversary of The Devil Wears Prada release, in 2016, The Ringer noted how Wintour's personal image had evolved since that film's depiction of Miranda Priestley. "A decade ago this summer, Wintour became a living, breathing avatar for a certain kind of boss—the terrible kind, with 'great' a halfhearted asterisk", wrote Alison Herman. "The Devil Wears Prada transformed Wintour's image from that of a mere public figure into that of a cultural icon."

But since then, "Wintour isn't just redeemed. She's openly admired, Arctic chill and all." The grievances reflected in the novel and film "[seem] like an increasingly petty complaint when held up against a readership that remains well into the seven figures and the undisputed edge in ad sales that comes with it. Wintour is seemingly the only person on earth who knows how to run a steady print operation in 2016 ... At 10 years old, Miranda Priestley is iconic but ever-so-slightly out of date. Anna Wintour is still the boss..."

In a May 2017 ceremony at Buckingham Palace, Wintour was created a Dame Commander of the Order of the British Empire by Queen Elizabeth II for her contributions to fashion and journalism. According to a January 2017 report in The Nation, an American news magazine, it was rumored that Wintour would have become the United States Ambassador to the United Kingdom had Hillary Clinton been elected  President of the United States the previous November.

2020s
In May 2020, former editor-at-large, André Leon Talley, released his second memoir, The Chiffon Trenches, which exposed Talley and Wintour's personal fall out in 2018 after he was discontinued as Vogues Met Gala red carpet reporter.

Following the murder of George Floyd, Wintour was reported to have issued an apology to staff for Vogues complicity in racism, stating the magazine had "not found enough ways to elevate and give space to Black editors, writers, photographers, designers and other creators".

On 15 December 2020, Condé Nast promoted Wintour to the role of chief content officer, worldwide, as part of a restructuring the company unveiled. In addition, she will be working as global editorial director of Vogue.

Influence in fashion industry
Through the years, she has come to be regarded as one of the most powerful people in fashion, setting trends, and anointing new designers. Industry publicists often hear "Do you want me to go to Anna with this?" when they have differences with her subordinates. The Guardian has called her the "unofficial mayoress" of New York City. She has encouraged fashion houses such as Christian Dior to hire younger, fresher designers such as John Galliano. Her influence extends outside fashion. She persuaded Donald Trump to let Marc Jacobs use a ballroom at the Plaza Hotel for a show when Jacobs and his partner were short of cash. In 2006, she persuaded Brooks Brothers to hire the relatively unknown Thom Browne. A protégée at Vogue, Plum Sykes, became a successful novelist, drawing her settings from New York's fashionable élite.

Her salary was reported to be $2 million a year in 2005. In addition, she receives several perks, such as a chauffeured Mercedes S-Class (both in New York and abroad), a $200,000 shopping allowance,  and the Coco Chanel Suite at the Hotel Ritz Paris while attending European fashion shows. Condé Nast president S.I. Newhouse had the company make her an interest-free $1.6 million loan to purchase her townhouse in Greenwich Village.

Charity work
Wintour serves as a trustee of the Metropolitan Museum of Art in New York, where she has organised benefits that have raised $50 million for the museum's Costume Institute. She began the CFDA/Vogue Fund in order to encourage, support and mentor unknown fashion designers. She has also raised over $10 million for AIDS charities since 1990, by organising various high-profile benefits.

Personal life

Relationships
Wintour began dating well-connected older men during her teens. She was briefly involved with novelist Piers Paul Read when she was 15 and he was 24. In her later teens, she dated gossip columnist Nigel Dempster and the two became a fixture on the London club circuit.

Wintour married child psychiatrist David Shaffer in 1984, and they had a son named Charles (born 1985) and a daughter named Katherine (born 1987) before divorcing in 1999. Charles is a graduate of the University of Oxford and Columbia College of Physicians and Surgeons. Katherine wrote occasional columns for The Daily Telegraph in 2006 and graduated from Columbia University in 2009, but says she will not follow her mother into fashion. Katherine married Italian filmmaker Francesco Carrozzini, son of Vogue Italia editor-in-chief Franca Sozzani, in 2018.

Newspapers and gossip columnists claimed that Wintour's affair with investor Shelby Bryan ended her marriage to Shaffer. She declined to comment.Oppenheimer, 342. A former colleague quoted in the Observer said that Bryan "mellowed her" and that she "smiles now and has been seen to laugh". She split with Bryan in 2020.

Residence
Wintour resides in New York City's Greenwich Village.

Habits
Wintour says she wakes up at 5:30 a.m., plays tennis, gets her hair and makeup done, and then arrives at the Vogue offices at 7:30 a.m. She always turns up at fashion shows well before their scheduled start, stating, "I use the waiting time to make phone calls and notes; I get some of my best ideas at the shows." According to the BBC documentary series Boss Woman, she rarely stays at parties for more than 20 minutes at a time and usually goes to bed by 10:15 p.m. at the latest. She turns off her mobile phone so as not to be disturbed while eating her lunch, which is most often a steak or a hamburger without the bun. High-protein meals have been a habit of hers for a long time. A co-worker at Harpers & Queen said that she would eat "smoked salmon and scrambled eggs" every single day and that "she would eat nothing else".

Personal fashion
Because of her position, Wintour's wardrobe is often closely scrutinised and imitated. Earlier in her career, she mixed fashionable t-shirts and vests with designer jeans. When she started at Vogue as creative director, she switched to Chanel suits with miniskirts. She continued to wear them during both pregnancies, opening the skirts slightly in back and keeping her jacket on to cover up. Wintour was listed as "one of the 50 best-dressed over 50s" by The Guardian in March 2013. Aside from sporting Chanel suits with midiskirts, she has also been seen wearing kitten heels & printed midi-dresses.

According to biographer Jerry Oppenheimer, her ubiquitous sunglasses are actually corrective lenses, since she has deteriorating vision as her father did. A former colleague he interviewed recalls trying on her Wayfarers in her absence and getting dizzy. "I think at this point they've become, you know, really armour", Wintour herself told 60 Minutes correspondent Morley Safer, explaining that they allow her to keep her reactions to a show private. As she rebounded from the end of her marriage and the turnover in the magazine's editorial staff, a fellow editor and friend noted that "she's not hiding behind her glasses anymore. Now she's having fun again."

Politics
Wintour has supported the Democratic Party since Hillary Clinton's 2000 Senate run and John Kerry's 2004 presidential campaign. She also served as a "bundler" of contributions during Barack Obama's presidential campaigns in 2008 and 2012. She co-hosted fundraisers for Obama's campaigns with Sarah Jessica Parker, with one being a 50-person, $40,000-per-person dinner at Parker's West Village town house with Meryl Streep, Michael Kors, and advertising executive Trey Laird among the attendees. She also teamed with Calvin Klein and Harvey Weinstein on fundraisers during Obama's first term, with Donna Karan among the attendees.

In 2013, when Vogues former director of communications stepped down, Wintour was rumoured to be looking to hire someone with a political background. Soon after, she hired Hildy Kuryk, who worked as a fundraiser for the Democratic National Committee and Obama's 2008 campaign. She supported Hillary Clinton's 2016 presidential campaign, forming part of Clinton's long list of wealthy donors and served as Clinton's consultant on wardrobe choices for key moments of the campaign. Wintour endorsed Joe Biden for the 2020 United States presidential election.

The Devil Wears Prada

Lauren Weisberger, a former Wintour assistant who left Vogue for Departures along with Richard Story, wrote The Devil Wears Prada after a writing workshop he suggested she take. It was eagerly anticipated for its supposed insider portrait of Wintour prior to its publication. Wintour told The New York Times, "I always enjoy a great piece of fiction. I haven't decided whether I am going to read it or not." While it has been suggested that the fashion magazine setting and Miranda Priestly character were based on Vogue and Wintour, Weisberger claims she drew not only from her own experiences but those of her friends as well. Wintour herself makes a cameo appearance near the end of the book, where it is said she and Miranda dislike each other.

In the novel, Priestly has many similarities to Wintour—among them, she is British, has two children, and is described as a major contributor to the Met. Priestly is a tyrant who makes impossible demands of her subordinates, gives them almost none of the information or time necessary to comply and then berates them for their failures to do so.

Kate Betts, who had been fired by Harper's after two years during which staffers said she tried too hard to emulate Wintour, reviewed it harshly in The New York Times Book Review:

Priestly has some positive qualities. Andrea Sachs, the novel's main character, notes that she makes all the magazine's key editorial decisions by herself and that she has genuine class and style. "I never for one second didn't know it was an amazing opportunity to assist Anna", Weisberger said in 2008.

Film adaptation

During the production of The Devil Wears Prada in 2005, Wintour was reportedly threatening prominent fashion personalities, particularly designers, that Vogue would not cover them if they made cameo appearances in the movie as themselves. She denied it through a spokesperson who said she was interested in anything that "supports fashion". Many designers are mentioned in the film. Only one, Valentino Garavani, appeared as himself.

The film was released, in mid-2006, to great commercial success. Wintour attended the première wearing Prada. In the film, actress Meryl Streep plays a Priestly different enough from the book's to receive critical praise as an entirely original (and more sympathetic) character. (Streep's office in the film was similar enough to Wintour's that Wintour reportedly had hers redecorated.)

Wintour reportedly said the film would probably go straight to DVD. It made over $300 million in worldwide box office receipts. Later in 2006, in an interview with Barbara Walters that aired the day of the DVD's release, Wintour said she found the film "really entertaining" and praised it for making fashion "entertaining and glamorous and interesting ... I was 100 percent behind it."

That opinion of the movie has not yet led her to forgive Weisberger. When it was reported that the novelist's editor told her to start her third novel over, Wintour's spokesman suggested she "should get a job as someone else's assistant."

Oppenheimer suggests The Devil Wears Prada may have done Wintour a favour by increasing her name recognition. "Besides giving Weisberger her fifteen minutes", he says, "[it] ... place[d] Anna squarely in the mainstream celebrity pantheon. [She] was now known and talked about over Big Macs and french fries under the Golden Arches by young fashionistas in Wal-Mart denim in Davenport and Dubuque."

When The September Issue was released three years later, critics compared it with the earlier, fictional film. "For the past year or so, she's been on the media warpath to win back her image", said Paul Schrodt in Slant Magazine. Many considered the question of how similar she was to Streep's Priestly, and praised the film for showing the real person. Manohla Dargis at The New York Times said that Priestly had helped humanise Wintour, and "the documentary continues this". "The movie offers insights that lift it beyond a realist version of The Devil Wears Prada", agreed Mary Pols in Time.

The film version of the Weisberger novel (screenplay penned by Aline Brosh McKenna) has not been the only movie to have a character borrowing some aspects of Wintour. Edna Mode's similar hairstyle in The Incredibles has been noted, Johnny Depp said he partially based the demeanour of Willy Wonka in Charlie and the Chocolate Factory on Wintour. Fey Sommers in the Ugly Betty television series was also likened to Wintour, from the trademark bob and sunglasses, to Wintour's last name homophonous with 'Winter', while Sommers' is homophonous with 'Summer'.

Criticism
In 2005, two years after The Devil Wears Prada, Oppenheimer's Front Row: The Cool Life and Hot Times of Vogue's Editor in Chief was published. It painted a similar portrait of the real woman. According to Oppenheimer, Wintour not only declined his requests for an interview but discouraged others from talking to him.

Personality
Wintour is often described as emotionally distant by those who have come to know her well, even her close friends. "At some stage in her career, Anna Wintour stopped being Anna Wintour and became 'Anna Wintour,' at which point, like wings of a stately home, she closed off large sections of her personality to the public", wrote The Guardian. "I think she enjoys not being completely approachable. Just her office is very intimidating. You have to walk about a mile into the office before you get to her desk and I'm sure it's intentional", Coddington says. "I don't find her to be accessible to people she doesn't need to be accessible to", agrees Vogue publisher Tom Florio.

She has said she admired her father Charles, known as "Chilly Charlie" for being "inscrutable". Former coworkers told Oppenheimer of a similar aloofness on her part. But she is also known for volatile outbursts of displeasure, and the widely used "Nuclear Wintour" sobriquet is a result of both. She dislikes it enough to have asked The New York Times not to use it. "There are times I get quite angry", she admitted in The September Issue.

"I think she has been very rude to a lot of people in the past, on her way up – very terse", a friend told The Observer. "She doesn't do small talk. She is never going to be friends with her assistant." Junior staff at Vogue are said to understand, through unwritten rules, that they should not initiate interactions with her; it has been said that they are discouraged from riding an elevator with her, and if they do, should not speak to her, though Wintour has called this an exaggeration.Stummer, Robin; 18 June 2006; "Nuclear Wintour: The Movie"; The Independent on Sunday. Retrieved 7 February 2007. In a 1999 profile, journalist Kevin Gray observed that one staffer appeared "panic stricken" when she realised she would have to be in the elevator with Wintour. Gray also reports that another employee told him that she once saw Wintour trip in a hallway, walked past her without offering assistance, and was later told she "did  the right thing."

Even friends admit to some trepidation in her presence. "Anna happens to be a friend of mine", says Barbara Amiel, "a fact which is of absolutely no help in coping with the cold panic that grips me whenever we meet." "I know when to stop pushing her", says Coddington. "She doesn't know when to stop pushing me."

She has often been described as a perfectionist who routinely makes impossible, arbitrary demands of subordinates: "kitchen scissors at work", in the words of one commentator. She once made a junior staffer look through a photographer's trash to find a picture he had refused to give her. In a deleted scene from The September Issue, she complains about the "horrible white plastic buckets" of ice behind the bars at the CFDA's 7th on Sale AIDS benefit and moves them out of sight. "The notion that Anna would want something done 'now' and not 'shortly' is accurate", Amiel says of The Devil Wears Prada. "Anna wants what she wants right away." A longtime assistant says, "She throws you in the water and you'll either sink or swim."

Peter Braunstein, a former Women's Wear Daily media reporter convicted of sexually assaulting a coworker, allegedly planned to kill Wintour because of perceived slights. After receiving only one ticket to the 2002 Vogue Fashion Awards, which he perceived as a snub, his anger cost him his job. At his 2007 trial, prosecutors introduced as evidence a journal he kept on his computer in which he stated his intention to kill Wintour. In it he wrote, "She just never talked to peons like us" to justify his intended actions.

On one occasion she had to pay for her treatment of employees. In 2004, a court ruled that she and Shaffer were to pay $104,403, and Wintour herself an additional $32,639, to settle a lawsuit brought against them by the New York State Workers' Compensation Board. They had failed to pay the $140,000 judgement against them by a former employee of theirs (not the magazine) injured on the job, who did not have the necessary insurance coverage.

In the 2000s, her relationship with Bryan was credited with softening her personality at work. "Even when she's in a bad mood, she has a different posture [...] is that she's so much more mellow and easier to work for", someone described as a "Wintour watcher" told The New York Observer in 2000.

Pro-fur stance
She has often been the target of animal rights organisations like PETA, who are angered by her use of fur in Vogue, her pro-fur editorials and her refusal to run paid advertisements from animal rights organisations. Undeterred, she continues to use fur in photo spreads, saying there is always a way to wear it. "Nobody was wearing fur until she put it on the cover in the early 1990s", says Vogue co-worker Tom Florio. "She ignited the entire industry."

She has "lost count" of the times she has been physically attacked by activists. In Paris in October 2005, she was hit with a tofu pie while waiting to get into the Chloé show. On another occasion, an activist dumped a dead raccoon on her plate at a restaurant; she told the waiter to remove it. She and Vogue publisher Ron Galotti once retaliated for a protest outside the Condé Nast offices during the company's annual Christmas party by sending down a plate of roast beef.

Others outside of the animal rights community have raised the fur issue. Fashion journalist Peter Braunstein wrote in his manifesto that she would go to a hell guarded by large rats, where it would be so warm she would not need to wear fur. Pamela Anderson, in an early 2008 interview, said Wintour was the living person she most despised "because she bullies young designers and models to use and wear fur."

Elitism
Another common criticism of Wintour's editorship focuses on Vogue increasing use of celebrities on the cover, and her insistence on making them meet her standards.Landman, Beth, and Mitchell, Deborah; 28 September 1998; But Can Oprah Fit Into Alaia?; New York. Retrieved 2 March 2007. She reportedly told Oprah Winfrey to lose weight before her cover photograph. Likewise, Hillary Clinton was told not to wear a blue suit. At the 2005 Anglomania celebration, a Vogue-sponsored salute to British fashion at the Met, Wintour is said to have personally chosen the clothes for prominent attendees such as Jennifer Lopez, Kate Moss, Donald Trump, and Diane von Fürstenberg. "I don't think Vreeland had that kind of concentration", says Women's Wear Daily publisher Patrick McCarthy. "She wouldn't have dressed Babe Paley. Nor would Babe Paley have let her." By persuading designers to lend clothes to prominent socialites and celebrities, who are then photographed wearing the clothes not only in Vogue but more general-interest magazines like People and Us, which in turn influence what buyers want, some in the industry believe Wintour is exerting too much control over it, especially since she is not involved in making or producing clothes herself. "The end result is that Anna can control it all the way to the selling floor", says Candy Pratts Price, executive fashion director at style.com. She has been credited with killing grunge fashion in the early 1990s, when it was not selling well, by telling designers if they continued to avoid glamour their looks would not be photographed for Vogue. All complied.

Another Vogue writer has complained Wintour excluded ordinary working women, many of whom are regular subscribers, from the pages. "She's obsessed only about reflecting the aspirations of a certain class of reader", she says. "We once had a piece about breast cancer which started with an airline stewardess, but she wouldn't have a stewardess in the magazine so we had to go and look for a high-flying businesswoman who'd had cancer."

Wintour has been accused of setting herself apart even from peers. "I do not think fiction could surpass the reality", a British fashion magazine editor says of The Devil Wears Prada. "[A]rt in this instance is only a poor imitation of life." Wintour, the editor says, routinely requests to be seated out of sight of competing editors at shows. "We spend our working lives telling people which it-bag to carry but Anna is so above the rest of us she does not even have a handbag."

At Milan Fashion Week in 2008, she requested that some key shows be rescheduled for earlier in the week so she and other U.S.-based editors could have time to return home before the Paris shows. This led to complaints. Other editors said they had to rush through the earlier shows, and lesser-known designers who had to show later were denied an important audience. Dolce & Gabbana said Italian fashion was getting short shrift and Milan was becoming a "circus without sense".

Giorgio Armani, who at the time was co-chairing a Met exhibition on superheroes' costumes with Wintour, drew some attention for his personal remarks. "Maybe what she thinks is a beautiful dress, I wouldn't think was a beautiful dress", he said. While he claimed he could not understand why people disliked her, saying he himself was indifferent, he expressed hope she had not made a comment once attributed to her that "the Armani era is over". He accused her of preferring French and American fashion over Italian. Geoffrey Beene, who stopped inviting Wintour to shows after she stopped writing about him, called her "a boss lady in four-wheel drive who ignores or abandons those who do not fuel her tank. As an editor, she has turned class into mass, taste into waste."

Her remarks about obesity have caused controversy on more than one occasion. In 2005, Wintour was heavily criticised by the New York chapter of the National Association to Advance Fat Acceptance after Vogue editor-at-large André Leon Talley said on The Oprah Winfrey Show, at one point, Wintour demanded he lose weight. "Most of the Vogue girls are so thin, tremendously thin", he said, "because Miss Anna don't like fat people." In 2009, residents of Minneapolis took umbrage after she told 60 Minutes she could "only kindly describe most of the people I saw as little houses." They noted their city had been named the third fittest in the nation that year by Men's Fitness while New York had been named the fifth fattest.

Wintour surprised observers when developing an association with the Kardashian family and Kanye West, which culminated in having the Kardashian-Wests on a Vogue cover; Wintour reportedly commented that having only "deeply tasteful" people in the magazine was "boring", and her decision to resort to such personalities has led some to accuse the magazine of being "desperate for buzz". Wintour has nevertheless continued the association with the pair.

Responses
Defences of Wintour have often come from others. Amanda Fortini at Slate said she was comfortable with Wintour's elitism since that was intrinsic to fashion:

Emma Brockes sees this in Wintour herself: "[Her] unwavering ability to look as if she lives within the pages of her magazine has a sort of honesty to it, proof that, whatever one thinks about it, the lifestyle peddled by Vogue is at least physically possible."

"Print publications have to be as luxurious an experience as possible", Wintour explained in 2015. "You have to feel it coming off the page. You have to see photographs and pieces that you couldn't possibly see anywhere else."

Some friends see her purported coldness as just traditional British reserve, or shyness. Brockes says it may be mutual, "partly a reflection of how awkward people are with her, particularly women, who get preemptively chippy when faced with the prospect of meeting Fashion Incarnate." Wintour describes herself as shy, and Harry Connick Jr., who escorted her and Bee to shows in 2007, agrees. When Morley Safer asked her about complaints about her personality, she said,

She has made similar statements in defence of her reported refusal to hire fat people. "It's important to me that the people that are working here, particularly in the fashion department", she says, "will present themselves in a way that makes sense to the outside world that they work at Vogue."

Her defenders have called criticism sexist. "Powerful women in the media always get inspected more thoroughly than their male counterparts", said The New York Times in a piece about Wintour shortly after The Devil Wears Prada release. When Wintour took over at Vogue, gossip columnist Liz Smith reported rumours she had gotten the job through an affair with Si Newhouse. A reportedly furious Wintour made her anger the subject of one of her first staff meetings; she still complained about the allegation when accepting a media award in 2002.

She has been called a feminist whose changes to Vogue have reflected, acknowledged, and reinforced advances in the status of women. Reviewing Oppenheimer's book in the Washington Monthly, managing editor Christina Larson notes that Vogue, unlike many other women's magazines,
Wintour, unlike Vreeland, "...shifted Vogues focus from the cult of beauty to the cult of the creation of beauty." To Wintour, the focus on celebrities is a welcome development as it means women are making the cover of Vogue at least in part for what they have accomplished, not just how they look.

Complaints about her role as fashion eminence grise are dismissed by those familiar with how she actually exercises it. "She's honest. She tells you what she thinks. Yes is yes and no is no", according to designer Karl Lagerfeld. "She's not too pushy", agrees François-Henri Pinault, chief executive officer of Kering, Gucci's parent company. "She lets you know it's not a problem if you can't do something she wants." Defenders also point out she continued supporting Gucci despite her strong belief Kering should not have let Tom Ford go. Designers such as Alice Roi and Isabel Toledo have flourished without indulging Wintour or Vogue. Her willingness to throw her weight around has helped keep Vogue independent despite its heavy reliance on advertising dollars. Wintour was the only fashion editor who refused to follow an Armani ultimatum to feature more of its clothes in the magazine's editorial pages, although she has also admitted if she has to choose between two dresses, one by an advertiser and the other not, she will choose the former every time. "Commercial is not a dirty word to me."

Wintour herself, when asked about it, dismisses the notion that she has all the power attributed to her. "I don't think of myself as a powerful person", she told Forbes in 2011, when it named her 69th on its list of the world's hundred most powerful women. "You know, what does it mean? It means you get a better seat in a restaurant or tickets to a screening or whatever it may be. But it is a wonderful opportunity to be able to help others, and for that I'm extremely grateful."

In response to criticisms like Beene's, she has defended the democratisation of what were once exclusive luxury brands. "It means more people are going to get better fashion", she told Dana Thomas. "And the more people who can have fashion, the better."

See also
 New Yorkers in journalism

References

Works cited

Horyn, Cathy (1 February 2007). "Citizen Anna". The New York Times. Retrieved 2 February 2007.
 Oppenheimer, Jerry (2005). Front Row: The Cool Life and Hot Times of Vogue's Editor In Chief. St. Martin's Press, New York. .

 Weisberger, Lauren (2003). The Devil Wears Prada''. Broadway Books, New York. .

External links

 

1949 births
Living people
20th-century American journalists
20th-century American women writers
20th-century American writers
20th-century British journalists
21st-century American journalists
21st-century American women writers
21st-century American writers
21st-century British journalists
21st-century English women writers
21st-century English writers
American fashion businesspeople
American fashion journalists
American magazine editors
American women journalists
British Vogue
Dames Commander of the Order of the British Empire
English businesspeople in fashion
English fashion journalists
English magazine editors
English people of American descent
English women journalists
Fashion editors
Journalists from London
Journalists from New York City
People educated at North London Collegiate School
People from Greenwich Village
People with acquired American citizenship
Vogue (magazine) editors
Anna
Writers from London
Writers from Manhattan
Women magazine editors
20th-century English women
20th-century English people